Louis de Noailles, 4th Duke of Noailles (21 April 1713 in Versailles22 August 1793 in Saint-Germain-en-Laye) was a French peer and Marshal of France. He was the son of Françoise Charlotte d'Aubigné, niece of Madame de Maintenon, and a nephew of Marie Victoire de Noailles, daughter-in-law of Louis XIV of France.

Life
Louis bore the title of Duke of Ayen until his father's death in 1766 when he became Duke of Noailles. On 25 February 1737 he married Cathérine Françoise Charlotte de Cossé-Brissac, with whom he had four children, two sons and two daughters: John Paul. Duke of Ayen, Adrienne Catherine de Noailles, Emmanuel de Noailles, and Philippine Louise de Noailles. He served in most of the wars of the eighteenth century without particular distinction, but was nevertheless made a Marshal of France in 1775. He refused to emigrate during the Revolution but escaped the guillotine by dying in August 1793.

Family
The duke's widow, granddaughter, and daughter-in-law were guillotined on 22 July 1794, twenty-five days after his brother and sister, sister-in-law, their daughter-in-law, and niece had met the same fate. Another granddaughter, Adrienne, wife of Gilbert du Motier, marquis de La Fayette, was saved due to the efforts of James Monroe, then America's Minister to France. Adrienne and her husband are buried with the Noailles and the other nobles who fell to the guillotine at Picpus Cemetery.

Louis de Noailles was succeeded by his eldest son, Jean de Noailles. The titles remain among the 4th Duke's descendants in the 21st century.

References

External links
Généalogie de Carné

1713 births
1793 deaths
People from Versailles
Burials at Picpus Cemetery
Noailles, Louis of
Louis
Louis
Marshals of France
18th-century peers of France